Greece (GRE) competed at the 2005 Mediterranean Games in Almería, Spain. The nation had a total number of 341 participants (207 men and 134 women).

Medals

Gold

 Athletics 
Pole vault: Konstantinos Filippidis
Triple jump: Hristos Meletoglou
javelin throw: Aggeliki Tsiolakoudi
400 metres: Dimitra Ntova

 Judo
Men's Middleweight (– 90 kg): Ilias Iliadis

 Rowing
Men's Lightweight Double Sculls: Vasileios Polymeros and Nikolaos Skiathitis

 Swimming
Men's 50m Backstroke: Aristeidis Grigoriadis
Men's 100m Backstroke: Aristeidis Grigoriadis
Men's 200m Butterfly: Ioannis Drymonakos

Wrestling
Grecoroman(120 kg) Xenofon Koutsioumpas 
Freestyle (174 kg) Theodosios Pavlidis 
Freestyle (48 kg) Fani Psatha

Silver
Wrestling

-Men's grecoroman(96 kg) Koutsioumpas Georgios

 Athletics 
Heptathlon: Argyro Strataki
Hammer throw: Alexandros Papadimitriou

 Basketball
Men's Team Competition: Nikolaos Barlos, Anastasios Charismidis, Dimitrios Charitopoulos, Georgios Dedas, Ioannis Georgallis, Savvas Iliadis, Panayiotis Kafkis, Theofanis Koumpouras, Nikolaos Papanikolopoulos, Angelos Siamantouras, Christos Tapoutos, and Georgios Tsiakos

 Judo
Women's Lightweight (– 57 kg): Ioulieta Boukouvala

 Rowing
Men's Coxless Pairs: Ioannis Christou and Nikolaos Pagounis
Women's Lightweight Single Sculls: Chrysi Biskitzi

 Swimming
Men's 400m Freestyle: Spyridon Gianniotis
Men's 1500m Freestyle: Spyridon Gianniotis
Men's 100m Breaststroke: Romanos Alyfantis
Men's 4 × 200 m Freestyle Relay: Andreas Zisimos, Apostolos Antonopoulos, Dimitrios Manganas, and Nikolaos Xylouris

Bronze
 Athletics 
Triple jump: Hrysopiyi Devetzi
100 metres hurdles: Flora Redoumi
Pole vault: Afroditi Skafida
Hammer throw: Alexandra Papageorgiou
400 metres hurdles: Platon Gkavelas
Long jump: Stergios Nousios

 Boxing
Men's Lightweight (– 60 kg): Orestis Saridis

 Judo
Men's Half-Heavyweight (– 100 kg): Dionysios Iliadis

 Swimming
Men's 800m Freestyle: Spyridon Gianniotis
Men's 400m Medley: Ioannis Drymonakos
Men's 4 × 100 m Freestyle Relay: Apostolos Antonopoulos, Andreas Zisimos, Apostolos Tsagkarakis, and Aristeidis Grigoriadis
Women's 200m Freestyle: Zoi Dimoschaki
Women's 400m Freestyle: Zoi Dimoschaki
Women's 1500m Freestyle: Marianna Lymperta
Women's 50m Breaststroke: Vasiliki Kavarnou
Women's 100m Breaststroke: Angeliki Exarchou
Women's 4 × 100 m Freestyle Relay: Eleni Kosti, Zoi Dimoschaki, Zampia Melachroinou, and Aikaterini Bliamou

Results by event

Water Polo
Team Roster
Evangelos Delakas   
Daniil Dikaios  
Konstantinos Flegkas  
Georgios Fountoulis  
Ioannis Fountoulis  
Dionysios Karountzos  
Vasileios Liotsakis   
Dimitrios Miteloudis  
Nikolaos Ntoulos  
Georgios Stakias  
Nikolaos Stellatos

See also
 Greece at the 2004 Summer Olympics
 Greece at the 2008 Summer Olympics

References

 Official Site
https://web.archive.org/web/20140623202533/http://www.cijm.org.gr/images/stories/pdf/JM2005.pdf

Nations at the 2005 Mediterranean Games
2005
Mediterranean Games